Awesome God: A Tribute to Rich Mullins is a tribute album consisting of songs written by American singer and songwriter Rich Mullins, as recorded by popular contemporary Christian music artists. It was released on November 10, 1998, about a year after Mullins' death.

Track listing
Note: All songs written by Rich Mullins, unless otherwise noted.
 "Awesome God" - Michael W. Smith
Mullins' version appeared on Winds of Heaven, Stuff of Earth 1988
 "Jacob and 2 Women" - Carolyn Arends
Mullins' version appeared on The World as Best as I Remember It, Volume One 1991
 "Verge of a Miracle" - Billy Crockett
Mullins' version appeared on Pictures in the Sky 1987
 "Hold Me Jesus" - Amy Grant
Mullins' version appeared on A Liturgy, a Legacy, & a Ragamuffin Band 1993
 "Calling Out Your Name" - Chris Rice
Mullins' version appeared on The World as Best as I Remember It, Volume One 1991
 "Elijah" - Gary Chapman
Mullins' version appeared on Rich Mullins 1986
 "If I Stand" (Rich Mullins and Steve Cudworth) - Jars of Clay
Mullins' version appeared on Winds of Heaven, Stuff of Earth 1988
 "A Place to Stand" - Billy Sprague
Mullins' version appeared on Rich Mullins 1986
 "Save Me" - Kevin Max
Mullins' version appeared on Rich Mullins 1986
 "I See You" - Ashley Cleveland
Mullins' version appeared on The World as Best as I Remember It, Volume One 1991
 "Step by Step" (Beaker) - Caedmon's Call
Mullins' version appeared on The World as Best as I Remember It, Volume One 1991

1998 compilation albums
Rich Mullins tribute albums